Bergrothia is a genus of beetles belonging to the family Staphylinidae.

Species:

Bergrothia adzharica 
Bergrothia barbakadzei 
Bergrothia lederi 
Bergrothia lenkorana 
Bergrothia mingrelica 
Bergrothia saulcyi 
Bergrothia solodovnikovi

References

Staphylinidae
Beetle genera